Ninga is a town and ward in Njombe Rural District in the Njombe Region of the Tanzanian Southern Highlands. Ninga Ward was created since the 2002 Tanzanian census, so the first population reports for the ward will be for the 2012 census. The name Ninga comes from the Swahili word for dove, ninga.

The area is primarily farmland with major crops being maize and coffee.

The ward consists of three towns, or large villages: Ninga, Lima and Isitu. Each of these has rural areas or small villages under them.

Notes

Wards of Njombe Region